Espaillat is one of the 32 provinces of the Dominican Republic. It is divided into 5 municipalities and its capital city is Moca. Located in north-central Dominican Republic (Cibao), it is bordered by the provinces of La Vega to the south, Santiago and Puerto Plata to the west, and María Trinidad Sánchez to the north-east. The province has a coastline to the north with the Atlantic Ocean. It is named for Ulises Francisco Espaillat (1823–1878), the 19th-century author who was briefly President of the Republic in 1876.

Municipalities and municipal districts
The province as of June 20, 2006 is divided into the following  municipalities (municipios) and municipal districts (distrito municipal - D.M.) within them:

Cayetano Germosén
Gaspar Hernández
Joba Arriba (D.M.)	
Veragua (D.M.)
Villa Magante (D.M.)
Jamao al Norte
Moca	
Canca La Reina (D.M.)
El Higüerito (D.M.)
José Contreras (D.M.)	
Juan López (D.M.)
La Ortega (D.M.)
Las Lagunas (D.M.)
Monte de La Jagua (D.M.)
San Víctor
	

The following is a sortable table of the municipalities and municipal districts with population figures as of the 2014 estimate. Urban population are those living in the seats (cabeceras literally heads) of municipalities or of municipal districts. Rural population are those living in the districts (Secciones literally sections) and neighborhoods (Parajes literally places) outside them. The population figures are from the 2014 population estimate.

For comparison with the municipalities and municipal districts of other provinces see the list of municipalities and municipal districts of the Dominican Republic.

References

External links

  Oficina Nacional de Estadística, Statistics Portal of the Dominican Republic
  Oficina Nacional de Estadística, Maps with administrative division of the provinces of the Dominican Republic, downloadable in PDF format

 
Provinces of the Dominican Republic
States and territories established in 1885